Giovanni Battista Giusti (c. 1624 - c. 1693) was a musical-instrument maker. He was a student first of Giovani Battista Boni, then Girolamo Zenti. He lived in Lucca, Italy.

References

External links
Museum Nord; Harpsichord  by Giovanni Battista Giusti

Harpsichord makers
Italian musical instrument makers
1620s births
1690s deaths